The Middletown Rockets were a Minor League Baseball club based in Middletown, Ohio. The Rockets joined the Ohio State League as a replacement for the Middletown Red Sox, playing from 1945 to 1946, while serving as an affiliate team for the Cincinnati Reds in 1946. Dale Long and Wally Post played for the Rockets.

References

1945 establishments in Ohio
1946 disestablishments in Ohio
Defunct baseball teams in Ohio
Defunct minor league baseball teams
Rockets
Baseball teams established in 1945
Sports clubs disestablished in 1946
Cincinnati Reds minor league affiliates
Baseball teams disestablished in 1946
Ohio State League teams